Resch is a surname of German origin. Notable people with the surname include:

Alessandro Resch (1892–1966), Italian flying ace
Alexander Resch (born 1979), German luger
Anton Resch (1921–1975), German fighter ace
Aurélie Resch, Canadian author and filmmaker
Chico Resch (born 1948), Canadian ice hockey goaltender
Edmund Resch (1847–1923), Australian brewer
Edward J. Resch, American businessman
Erwin Resch (born 1957), Austrian alpine skier
Francis Xavier Resch (1878–1976), Austrian-born American bishop
Franz Resch (born 1969), Austrian footballer
Friedrich Resch (born 1944), Austrian equestrian
Helmuth Resch (born 1933), Austrian fencer
Jakob Resch, West German bobsledder
Jami Resch (born 1973/1974), American police chief
Jutta Resch-Treuwerth (1941-2015), German journalist
Lisa Resch (1908–1949), German alpine skier
Nicole Resch (born 1975), German jurist
Nikolaus Resch (born 1984), Austrian sailor
Poldl Resch (1900–1971), Austrian footballer
Riitta Resch (born 1954), Finnish diplomat
Ron Resch (1939–2009), American computer scientist and artist
Thomas Resch (1460–1520), Austrian Renaissance humanist
Tina Resch (born 1969), U.S. citizen claiming to have psychokinetic abilities
Tony Resch, U.S. lacrosse player

German-language surnames